Hosseinabad (also Romanized as Ḩosseinābād) is a village in Khalili Rural District, in the Central District of Gerash County, Fars Province, Iran. At the 2016 census, its population was 501, in 131 families.

References 

Populated places in Gerash County